A video format is a medium for video recording and reproduction. The term is applied to both the physical recording media and the recording formats. Video is recorded and distributed using a variety of formats, some of which store additional information.

Timeline of video format developments

See also 

 Timeline of audio formats
 Format war

References

External links 

 History of Recording Technologies
 Museum Of Obsolete Media – Video Formats

 
Technology timelines
video
Obsolete technologies